James Cameron is a Canadian director, screenwriter, and producer who has had an extensive career in film and television. Cameron's debut was the 1978 science fiction short Xenogenesis, which he directed, wrote and produced. In his early career, he did various technical jobs such as special visual effects producer, set dresser assistant, matte artist, and photographer. His feature directorial debut was the 1982 release Piranha II: The Spawning. The next film he directed was the science fiction action thriller The Terminator (1984) which starred Arnold Schwarzenegger as the titular cyborg assassin, and was Cameron's breakthrough feature. In 1986, he directed and wrote the science fiction action sequel Aliens starring Sigourney Weaver. He followed this by directing another science fiction film The Abyss (1989). In 1991, Cameron directed the sequel to The Terminator, Terminator 2: Judgment Day (with Schwarzenegger reprising his role), and also executive produced the action crime film Point Break. Three years later he directed a third Schwarzenegger-starring action film True Lies (1994).

In 1997, Cameron directed, wrote, and produced the epic romantic disaster film Titanic which grossed over $1.8 billion at the worldwide box-office and became the highest grossing of all time. He received the Academy Award for Best Director, the Academy Award for Best Film Editing, and shared the Academy Award for Best Picture with the other producers. It had a total of 14 Oscar nominations (tying the record set by the 1950 drama All About Eve) and won 11 (tying the record set by the 1959 epic historical drama Ben-Hur). Cameron also won the Golden Globe Award for Best Director and shared the Golden Globe Award for Best Motion Picture – Drama with the other producers. He followed this by directing, and producing two underwater documentaries: Ghosts of the Abyss (2003), and Aliens of the Deep (2005). He returned to directing features in 2009 with the 3D science fiction film Avatar. It grossed over $2.9 billion at the worldwide box-office and became the highest grossing of all time surpassing Titanic. Avatar was nominated for nine Academy Awards and won three in technical categories. Cameron also earned a second Golden Globe Award for Best Director, and Best Motion Picture – Drama. He followed this by executive producing two 3D films, Sanctum (2011) and Cirque du Soleil: Worlds Away (2012), as well as the documentary Deepsea Challenge 3D (2014).

Cameron made his television debut in 1998 playing himself in the sitcom Mad About You. Two years later he executive produced the science fiction television series Dark Angel (2000) starring Jessica Alba. In 2005, he appeared in two documentaries about the sinking of the RMS Titanic: Last Mysteries of the Titanic, and Tony Robinson's Titanic Adventure. He also made appearances as himself on the comedy-drama television series Entourage that same year. Cameron followed this by executive producing two biblical documentaries, The Exodus Decoded (2006) and Lost Tomb of Jesus (2007). He executive produced and appeared in a third Titanic related documentary, Titanic: Final Word with James Cameron, in 2012. Two years later, Cameron executive produced the climate change documentary television series Years of Living Dangerously (2014) which received the Primetime Emmy Award for Outstanding Documentary or Nonfiction Series.

Film

Feature films

{| class="wikitable sortable plainrowheaders"
! rowspan="2" scope="col" |  Year
! width="22%" rowspan="2" scope="col" | Title
! colspan="5" scope="col" | Credited as 
! rowspan="2" scope="col" class="unsortable"| Notes 
! width="1%" rowspan="2" scope="col" class="unsortable" |
|-
! width=5% |Director
! width=5% |Writer
! width=5% |Producer
! width=5% |Editor
! width=5% |Other
|-
!scope="row"|1978
|Xenogenesis
|
|
|
|
|
|Short filmCo-directed and co-written with Randall FrakesVisual effects producer
|style="text-align:center;"|
|-
!scope="row"|1982
|Piranha II: The Spawning
|
|
|
|
|
|Co-written with Ovidio G. Assonitis and Charles H. Eglee
|style="text-align:center;"|
|-
!scope="row"|1984||
|
|
|
| 
|Co-written with Gale Anne Hurd
|style="text-align:center;"|
|-
!scope="row"|1985
|Rambo: First Blood Part II| 
|
|
|
|
|Co-written with Sylvester Stallone
|style="text-align:center;"|
|-
!scope="row"|1986
|Aliens|
|
|
|
| 
|
|style="text-align:center;"|
|-
!scope="row"|1989
||
|
| 
|
|
|
|style="text-align:center;"|
|-
!scope="row" |1991
|Terminator 2: Judgment Day|
|
|
|
| 
|Co-written with William Wisher Jr.
|style="text-align:center;"|
|-
!scope="row"|1994
|True Lies|
|
|
|
| 
|
|style="text-align:center;"|
|-
!scope="row"|1995
|Strange Days| 
|
|
|
| 
|Co-written with Jay Cocks
|style="text-align:center;"|
|-
!scope="row"|1997
|Titanic|
|
|
|
|
|Director of photography: Titanic deep dive
|style="text-align:center;"|
|-
!scope="row"|1999
||
|
| 
|
|
|Cameo: Himself
|style="text-align:center;"|
|-
!scope="row"|2000
|Auto Motives| 
|
|
|
|
|Short filmAppeared as himself
|style="text-align:center;"|
|-
!scope="row"|2001
|High Heels and Low Lifes| 
|
|
|
|
|Cameo: Reporter
|style="text-align:center;"|
|-
!scope="row"|2002
|Solaris|
|
|
|
| 
|
|style="text-align:center;"|
|-
!scope="row"|2009
|Avatar|
|
|
|
|
|
|style="text-align:center;"|
|-
!scope="row" rowspan="2"|2019
|Alita: Battle Angel| 
|
|
|
|
| Co-written with Laeta Kalogridis
|style="text-align:center;"|
|-
|Terminator: Dark Fate|
|
|
|
|
|Story co-written with Charles Eglee, Josh Friedman, David Goyer and Justin Rhodes
|style="text-align:center;"|
|-
!scope="row" | 2022
|Avatar: The Way of Water|
|
|
|
|
|Co-written with Rick Jaffa and Amanda Silver
|style="text-align:center;"|
|-
!scope=row align="left" style="background:#FFFFCC;"|2024
|Avatar 3|
|
|
|
|
| Post-production
|style="text-align:center;"|
|-
!scope=row align="left" style="background:#FFFFCC;"|2026
|Avatar 4|
|
|
|
|
| Filming
|style="text-align:center;"|
|}

Executive producer
 Point Break (1991)
 Sanctum (2011)
 Cirque du Soleil: Worlds Away'' (2012)

Documentary features

Other credits

Television

Television series

Documentary television films

Documentary series

Notes

References

External links
 

Director filmographies